

Louis Tronnier (21 November 1897 – 27 January 1952) was a general in the Wehrmacht of Nazi Germany during World War II.  He was a recipient of the Knight's Cross of the Iron Cross.  Tronnier surrendered to the Red Army forces during the second Soviet Jassy–Kishinev Offensive in August 1944.  He died on 27 January 1952 at Voikovo officers' prison camp near Ivanovo.

Awards and decorations

 Knight's Cross of the Iron Cross on 28 November 1942 as Oberst and commander of Grenadier-Regiment 70

References

Citations

Bibliography

 

1897 births
1952 deaths
Major generals of the German Army (Wehrmacht)
German Army personnel of World War I
Recipients of the clasp to the Iron Cross, 1st class
Recipients of the Gold German Cross
Recipients of the Knight's Cross of the Iron Cross
Military personnel from Braunschweig
German prisoners of war in World War II held by the Soviet Union
German people who died in Soviet detention
Prussian Army personnel
German Army generals of World War II